Lou Llobell (born 18 January 1995) is a London-based actress.

Early life 
Lou Llobell was born in Zimbabwe to a Spanish father and Zimbabwean mother. She grew up in Spain and South Africa.

She moved to England in 2013 to study drama at the University of Birmingham where she graduated with a Bachelor of Arts in Drama and Theatre Arts in 2016, before enrolling at the Drama Centre London in 2016 where she graduated with a Master of Arts in 2018.

Filmography

References

External links 
 
 Lou Llobell at Spotlight

Living people
1995 births
Alumni of the Drama Centre London
Alumni of the University of Birmingham
Expatriate actresses in the United Kingdom
21st-century Spanish actresses
Spanish film actresses
Spanish television actresses
21st-century Zimbabwean actresses
Zimbabwean film actresses
Zimbabwean television actresses